The Flag of the German Empire, or Imperial Flag, Realm Flag, (German: Reichsflagge) is a combination between the flag of Prussia and the flag of the Hanseatic League. The flag was first used as the flag of the North German Confederation which was formed in 1867. Later, during the Franco-Prussian War, the German Empire was founded (i.e., the South German states joined the Confederation). Germany would continue using it until the German Revolution of 1918–1919, which resulted in the founding of the Weimar Republic. 

The Weimar Republic did not use it as a national flag though it did see use within the Reichswehr. Immediately after the electoral victory of the Nazi Party in March 1933, German President Paul von Hindenburg reinstated the flag by decree as the co-official flag of Germany. In 1935, a year after Hindenburg's death, the Imperial Flag was banned from use as the national flag in favour of the black-red-white swastika flag.

During World War II, German exiles in the Soviet Union adopted it as their new flag for a free German state. Due to this, after World War II, it was proposed that East Germany adopted the Imperial Flag as their national flag.

Due to the ban on Nazi swastika flag in modern Germany, many German Neo-Nazis instead adopted the Imperial Flag. However, the flag never originally had any racist or anti-Semitic meaning, despite its brief use in Nazi Germany.

The flag is almost graphically identical to the modern flag of the Republic of Yemen, albeit with the colours reversed upside down and a different shade of red. The flag of Upper Volta, used in 1958–1984, had the same colour arrangement but with a slightly different shade of red.

Groups that use the Imperial flag

Historical

 National Committee for a Free Germany
 German National People's Party
 German Party (1947)
 German Empire Party
 Anti-Fascist Committee for a Free Germany

Modern day 
 National Democratic Party of Germany
 Reichsbürger movement

See also 

 German Reich
 State of the Teutonic Order
 German conservatism
 Freikorps

References

Empire
German Empire
North German Confederation
German Empire
German Empire
German Empire
Nazi symbolism
Neo-Nazism in Germany